Waterloo Revival was an American country music duo consisting of vocalists Cody Cooper and George Birge. The duo released two singles through Big Machine Records.

History
Cody Cooper and George Birge, natives of Austin, Texas, had been friends since middle school when they began performing music together. After high school, Birge worked in real estate and Cooper worked in mortgaging. The two reunited in 2013 and began writing songs and performing together. They took the name Waterloo Revival from the original name of the city of Austin.

The duo released a five-song extended play, and then signed to Big Machine Records, which released two singles: "Hit the Road" and "Bad for You".

In June 2016 Waterloo Revival signed to Toby Keith's record label Show Dog-Universal Music.

In 2017 the duo released a new single "What Guy Wouldn't" reaching the Top 40 on the Music Row charts. In 2018 they released a three-song EP "Wonder Woman".

Waterloo Revival broke up in February 2021. Later the same year, Birge released a solo single called "Beer Beer, Truck Truck".

Discography

Extended plays

Singles

Music videos

References

Country music groups from Texas
American musical duos
Big Machine Records artists
Country music duos
Musical groups established in 2013
Musical groups disestablished in 2021
Musical groups from Austin, Texas
2013 establishments in Texas